Sanyuka TV  is a Ugandan television network based in Kampala, Uganda.  It’s the official Broadcaster of the StarTimes Uganda Premier League for three seasons from 2018/19 to 2020/21.  It was  previously broadcast by GTV, DSTV and Azam.

Location
Its headquarter is located at Next Media Park, Plot 13, summit view Road, Kampala, Uganda.

Overview 
The channel was launched in September 2018. It started  broadcasting  on 10 September 2018.
The  station is known for its focus on  Ugandan sports,  also has a series of  edu-entertainment movies, sports, youth and entertainment shows. Each week it shows one English Premier League game.

References

External links
 Official site 
MTN Uganda, Sanyuka TV Partner to Broadcast Startimes Uganda Premier league 
StarTimes moves Uganda Premier League channel to cheapest package
StarTimes UPL: Why Sanyuka TV Was Reinstated Onto Nova Bouquet

Television stations in Uganda
English-language television stations
Television channels and stations established in 2018